Dasht (meaning "field") is a town in the Armavir Province of Armenia. Just outside the town is a 1st millennium BCE fortress.

See also 
Armavir Province

References 

Populated places in Armavir Province
Populated places established in 1926
Cities and towns built in the Soviet Union